Matt Daclan is a Cebuano actor.

Career
In 2014, Daclan appeared in the Cinema One Originals Digital Film Festival entry Soap Opera and won the Best Actor award.

Filmography

Television

Film

Awards and nominations

References

External links
 

Cebuano male film actors
Living people
Year of birth missing (living people)
Cebuano male television actors